Raja Mohamed Affandi bin Raja Mohamed Noor (Jawi: راج محمد أفندي راج محمد نور; born 20 June 1957 in Besut) is a Malaysian senior military officer, former Chief of Army and Chief of Defence Force.

Early life and education 
Raja Mohamed Affandi was born into a descendant of royal families (hence prefix Yang Mulia ('His Highness') instead of Yang Berbahagia ('The Honorable') on 20 June 1957, at Kampung Raja, Besut, Terengganu.

He received his primary education at Sekolah  Raja, Besut, and secondary education at Sekolah Menengah Sultan Ismail. He later attends Pre-Officer Cadet Training Unit (Pre-OCTU) at Sebatang Karah Camp, Port Dickson before continues his training as Cadet Officer at Royal Military College, Sungai Besi. He was commissioned as Second Lieutenant on 11 May 1977 and assigned to the Royal Malay Regiment.

He continues his study while he is still in the service. He obtains Master in Defence Studies from University of New South Wales and Master of Science in Defence and Strategic Studies from Quaid-i-Azam University.

Military career 
General Tan Sri Raja Mohamed Affandi was directly involved in Second Malayan Emergency during his early days as an army officer. He has led his unit as platoon commander and later as company commander fighting with communist insurgents. He then proceeded his military career as Aide-de-camp to Deputy Chief of Army, Lead Instructor at Army Basic Training Centre, Commander of 18th Battalion, Royal Malay Regiment (18 RAMD), Staff Officer 1 at National Operations Council (now National Security Council), Administration Staff Officer 1 at Army Human Resources Branch, chief-of-staff at 3rd Division Headquarters, assistant chief-of-staff at Army Planning and Development and Commander of 2nd Division.

He was promoted to Lieutenant General on 2 June 2008 and entrusted to hold Army Field Commander position. On 31 October 2009, he was assigned to chief-of-staff of Malaysian Armed Forces post. He then promoted to rank general on 15 June 2013, and in the same time promoted to Chief of Army position.

With his vast experience in the military and administration, he then promoted to the 19th Chief of Defence Forces on 16 December 2016, replacing General Zulkifeli Mohd Zain who has retired from the Armed Forces.

Retirement from Armed Forces 
Raja Mohamed Affandi retired from armed forces on 20 June 2018. His position as Chief of Defence Forces is succeeded by General Tan Sri Zulkifli Zainal Abidin.

Honours

Honours of Malaysia
  :
  Officer of the Order of the Defender of the Realm (K.M.N.) (2002)
  Companion of the Order of Loyalty to the Crown of Malaysia (J.S.M.) (2006)
  Commander of the Order of Meritorious Service (P.J.N.) - Datuk (2009)
  Commander of the Order of Loyalty to the Crown of Malaysia (P.S.M.) - Tan Sri (2014)
  Commander of the Order of the Defender of the Realm (P.M.N.) - Tan Sri (2017)
  Malaysia Service Medal
  Loyal Service Medal
  General Service Medal
  Golden Jubilee of the Grup Gerak Khas Medal - Gold Medal
 Malaysian Armed Forces
  Officer of The Most Gallant Order of Military Service (K.A.T.)
  Warrior of The Most Gallant Order of Military Service (P.A.T.)
  Loyal Commander of The Most Gallant Order of Military Service (P.S.A.T.)
  Courageous Commander of The Most Gallant Order of Military Service (P.G.A.T.)
  :
  Knight Companion of the Order of Sultan Ahmad Shah of Pahang (D.S.A.P.) – Dato' (2006)
  Grand Knight of the Order of Sultan Ahmad Shah of Pahang (S.S.A.P.) – Dato' Sri (2013)
 :
  Companion of the Order of the Defender of State (D.M.P.N.) - Dato' (2008)
  Knight Commander of the Order of the Defender of State (D.P.P.N.) - Dato' Seri (2014)
  :
  Knight Commander of the Glorious Order of the Crown of Kedah (D.G.M.K.) - Dato' Wira (2009)
  :
  Knight Grand Commander of the Order of the Noble Crown of Kelantan (S.P.K.K.) - Dato' (2009)
  Knight Grand Commander of the Order of the Crown of Kelantan (S.P.M.K.) - Dato' (2014)
  :
  Companion of the Order of Sultan Mizan Zainal Abidin of Terengganu (S.M.Z.) (2003)
  Knight Grand Commander of the Order of the Crown of Terengganu (S.P.M.T.) - Dato' (2011)
  :
  Knight Commander of the Exalted Order of Malacca (D.C.S.M.) - Datuk Wira (2014)
  :
  Knight Grand Commander of the Order of the Crown of Selangor (S.P.M.S.) - Dato' Seri (2014)
  :
  Knight Grand Commander of the Order of Taming Sari (S.P.T.S.) - Dato' Seri Panglima (2015)
  :
  Knight Grand Commander of the Order of the Crown of Perlis (S.P.M.P.) - Dato' Seri (2017)
 :
 Grand Commander of the Order of Kinabalu (S.P.D.K.) - Datuk Seri Panglima (2017)

Among of the federal, states and military awards that been bestowed to General Tan Sri Raja Mohamed Affandi including PGAT PMN PSM PJN SSAP SPMT SPMP SPMS SPTS SPMK SPKK DPPN DCSM PSAT DGMK DSDK DSAP DMPN PAT JSM SMZ KAT KMN PNBB.

Foreign honours
 :
  – Distinguished Service Order (Military) – Darjah Utama Bakti Cemerlang (Tentera) – (DUBC) (20 March 2018)
 :
  – The Most Exalted Order of Famous Valour 1st Cl – Darjah Paduka Keberanian Laila Terbilang Yang Amat Gemilang Darjah Pertama – (DPKT) which carries the title Dato Paduka Seri (15 July 2017).

  Overseas Service with the UN Missions Medal with "MOZAMBIQUE" bar

Personal life 
General Tan Sri Dato' Sri Raja Mohamed Affandi is married to Puan Sri Datin Sri Norlida binti Hj Abdul Mubin and together were blessed with 3 daughters and one son.

References 

Living people
1957 births
People from Terengganu
Malaysian people of Malay descent
Malaysian Muslims
Malaysian military personnel
Grand Commanders of the Order of Kinabalu
Officers of the Order of the Defender of the Realm
Companions of the Order of Loyalty to the Crown of Malaysia
Commanders of the Order of Meritorious Service
Commanders of the Order of Loyalty to the Crown of Malaysia
Commanders of the Order of the Defender of the Realm
21st-century Malaysian people
Recipients of the Darjah Utama Bakti Cemerlang (Tentera)
Knights Grand Commander of the Order of the Crown of Selangor
Knights Grand Commander of the Order of the Crown of Terengganu